Patrik Pacard was the sixth ZDF-Weihnachtsserie, and aired in 1984. The series was broadcast in Germany on ZDF, and consisted of 6 episodes. Broadcasting in Germany began on 25 December 1984. The series was also broadcast in Switzerland, and consisted of 12 episodes. Broadcasting in Switzerland began on 4 December 1984.

An English-language version of this series was shown by the BBC in the United Kingdom in 1992, and repeated in 1995, though with a revised plot to reflect the end of the Cold War. A French-language version of this series was broadcast as well.

The shows titular character and theme song are incorporated in an Internet meme on YTMND in relation to an alter-ego of Star Trek's Jean-Luc Picard, who was played by Patrick Stewart.

Story 
The story is about a German boy and his family getting into an espionage story whilst on holiday in Norway.

Media 
 Patrik Pacard, 2 DVD, Universum Film, ZDF-Video - 82876 63152 9
 Soundtrack

External links 
 Patrik Pacard in the Internet Movie Database
 Episode Guide 

1984 Swiss television series debuts
1985 Swiss television series endings
1980s Swiss television series
Swiss children's television series
1984 German television series debuts
1985 German television series endings
German children's television series
ZDF original programming
German-language television shows